, is a Japanese physicist and professor at the University of Tokyo best known for  having invented the magic wavelength technique for ultra precise optical lattice atomic clocks. Since 2011, Katori is also Chief Scientist at the Quantum Metrology Lab, RIKEN.

Recently, Katori's group performed a measurement of gravitational redshift with two transportable strontium optical lattice clocks over nearly the entire height of the Tokyo Skytree, setting a new record for the best ground-based test of general relativity.

Recognition
2005 – Award of Japan Society for the Promotion of Science
2005 – Springer Nature Applied Physics Award
2006 – Japan IBM Science Prize
2008 – I. I. Rabi Award
2010 – Ichimura Academic Award
2011 – Award of Minister of MEXT
2011 – Philipp Franz von Siebold-Preis, Germany
2012 – Asahi Prize
2013 – Nishina Memorial Prize
2013 – Fujiwara Prize
2013 – Toray Award in Science and Technology
2014 – Medal with Purple Ribbon
2015 – Japan Academy Prize (academics)
2017 – Leo Esaki Prize
2021 – 2022 Breakthrough Prize in Fundamental Physics

Selected publications

References

External links
 
 

Japanese physicists
University of Tokyo alumni
Academic staff of the University of Tokyo
Recipients of the Medal with Purple Ribbon
1964 births
Living people